Events from the year 1873 in Canada.

Incumbents

Crown
 Monarch – Victoria

Federal government
 Governor General – Frederick Hamilton-Temple-Blackwood 
 Prime Minister – John A. Macdonald (until November 5) then Alexander Mackenzie (from November 7)
 Parliament – 2nd (from 5 March)

Provincial governments

Lieutenant governors
Lieutenant Governor of British Columbia – Joseph Trutch
Lieutenant Governor of Manitoba – Alexander Morris
Lieutenant Governor of New Brunswick – Lemuel Allan Wilmot (until November 15) then Samuel Leonard Tilley
Lieutenant Governor of Nova Scotia – Charles Hastings Doyle (until May 1) then Joseph Howe (May 1 to July 4) then Adams George Archibald
Lieutenant Governor of Ontario – William Pearce Howland (until November 11) then John Willoughby Crawford
Lieutenant Governor of Prince Edward Island – William Cleaver Francis Robinson
Lieutenant Governor of Quebec – Narcisse-Fortunat Belleau (until February 11) then René-Édouard Caron

Premiers
Premier of British Columbia – Amor De Cosmos
Premier of Manitoba – Henry Joseph Clarke
Premier of New Brunswick – George Edwin King
Premier of Nova Scotia – William Annand
Premier of Ontario – Oliver Mowat
Premier of Prince Edward Island – James Colledge Pope (until September 1) then Lemuel Cambridge Owen
Premier of Quebec – Pierre-Joseph-Olivier Chauveau (until February 26) then Gédéon Ouimet

Territorial governments

Lieutenant governors
 Lieutenant Governor of the Northwest Territories – Alexander Morris

Events

January to June 1873
February 26 – Gédéon Ouimet becomes Premier of Quebec, replacing Pierre-Joseph-Olivier Chauveau
April 1
1873 Prince Edward Island general election
James Pope becomes Premier of Prince Edward Island for the second time, replacing Robert Haythorne
The SS Atlantic is wrecked off Peggys Cove
April 2 – The Pacific Scandal breaks out
May 13 – Sixty are killed in a coal mine explosion in Nova Scotia
May 23 – North-West Mounted Police are founded to police the Northwest Territories, which then included the region today of Alberta and Saskatchewan
June 1 – The Cypress Hills Massacre occurs.

July to December
July 1 – Prince Edward Island joins the Canadian Confederation.
August 25 – A cyclone hits Cape Breton Island, killing 500 and causing much damage
September 1 – L. C. Owen becomes Premier of Prince Edward Island, replacing James Pope
September 23 – The Canadian Labour Union is founded
November – 1873 Newfoundland general election
November 5 – Pacific Scandal: the House of Commons of Canada passes a vote of no confidence in Sir John A. Macdonald's government
November 7 – Pacific Scandal: Sir John A. resigns as Prime Minister of Canada, and Alexander Mackenzie is appointed in his place
November 8 – Winnipeg incorporated as a city

Sport 
October 4 – The Argonauts Football Club (Toronto Argonauts) are established

Smallpox
In the opening speech to the 1872-1873 Epidemiological Society conference, Inspector-General Robert Lawson drew attention to the recent prevalence of haemorrhagic forms of smallpox in both the United States and Canada, among other countries. During the smallpox pandemic of 1870-1874, the disease had been carried to America by emigrants, where it had already infected thousands, and killed hundreds in eastern cities such as Boston and New York.

Births

January to June

January 10 – George Orton, middle-distance runner and Olympic gold medallist, first Canadian to win an Olympic medal (d.1958)
January 19 – Thomas Dufferin Pattullo, politician and 22nd Premier of British Columbia (d.1956)
February 4 – Étienne Desmarteau, athlete and Olympic gold medallist (d.1905)
April 9 – Walter Edward Foster, businessman, politician and 16th Premier of New Brunswick (d.1947)
April 10 – George Black, politician (d.1965)
May 12 – J. E. H. MacDonald, artist of the Group of Seven (d.1932)
May 17 – Albert Edward Matthews, 16th Lieutenant Governor of Ontario (d.1949)

July to December
August 27 – Maud Allan, actor, dancer and choreographer (d.1956)
September 20 – Sidney Olcott, film producer, director, actor and screenwriter (d.1949)
October 20 (or 29) – Nellie McClung, feminist, politician and social activist (d.1951)
November 21 – Aimé Bénard, politician (d.1938)
December 8 – John Duncan MacLean, teacher, physician, politician and Premier of British Columbia (d.1948)
December 9 – George Blewett, academic and philosopher (d.1912)

Full date unknown
Margaret C. MacDonald, nurse (d.1948)

Deaths

May 15 – William James Anderson, physician, amateur geologist and historian (b.1812)
May 20 – George-Étienne Cartier, politician and statesman (b.1814)
May 28 – Thomas Brown Anderson, merchant, banker and politician (b.1796)
June 1 – Joseph Howe, Premier of Nova Scotia (b.1804)
June 28 – Charles Connell, politician (b.1810)
November 21 – James William Johnston, lawyer, politician, and judge (b.1792)
December 9 – William Steeves, politician (b.1814)

Historical documents
Non-confidence moved in House of Commons over Government accepting election funding from group hoping to build CPR

Why the Governor General did not dismiss Prime Minister Macdonald over the Pacific Scandal

Metis leader Ambroise Lepine sentenced to death for the murder of Thomas Scott in 1870 at Red River

House of Commons speeches on issues with Indigenous people in the Northwest Territories

British Columbia Indian superintendent reports on the economic activity of Indigenous people

References
  

 
Years of the 19th century in Canada
Canada
1873 in North America